"Honey Child" is a song by English hard rock supergroup Bad Company. The song was released as the third and final single from the band's third studio album Run with the Pack. It is one of the few Bad Company songs to be written by the entire band.

Cash Box said that the song is "hard rock ’n’ roll" with "a solid arrangement of music and voices" and that "the chorus is a good hook."  Record World said it was "an audience favorite" on the band's tour preceding the single release.

Track listing

Chart positions

References

Bad Company songs
1976 songs
1976 singles
Songs written by Paul Rodgers
Songs written by Mick Ralphs
Island Records singles
Swan Song Records singles